León is a Spanish surname. A habitational name from León, a city in northwestern Spain, named with Latin legio, genitive legionis ‘legion’, a division of the Roman army. In Roman times the city was the garrison of the 7th Legion, known as the Legio Gemina. The city's name became reduced from Legion(em) to Leon(em), and in this form developed an unetymological association with the word for ‘lion’, Spanish león. In Spanish it is also a nickname for a fierce or brave warrior, from león ‘lion’. Leon is also found as a Greek family name from Greek leon ‘lion’.

People with the surname León or Leon include:

 Adrianne León (born 1987), American actress
 Aldonza Alfonso de León (c. 1215–1266), illegitimate daughter of King Alfonso IX of León and his mistress Aldonza Martínez de Silva
 Alejandra León Gastélum (born 1976), Mexican politician
 Arcenio León (born 1986), Venezuelan baseball player
 Danilo León  (born 1967), Venezuelan professional baseball player
 Francis Leon (born 1844), American actor
 Gabriella Leon (born 1996), English actress
 José León Asensio (born 1934 ), Dominican businessman
 María Amalia León Cabral, Dominican arts patron (daughter of José León Asensio)
 Sarah Jorge León (born 1982), Dominican actress (daughter of María Amalia León Cabral)
 Leonardo León (born 1952), Chilean historian
 Léonie Léon (1838–1906), French mistress
 Pedro Pablo León (born 1943), Peruvian footballer
 Pierre Leon (1837-1915), American sailor
 Sandy León  (born 1989), Venezuelan professional baseball player
 Tony Leon (born 1956), South African politician
 Tony Leon (American football) (1917-2002), American football player
 Valerie Leon (born 1943), English actress

See also
De Leon
Liang (surname), a Chinese surname sometimes romanized as "Leon"

References

Surnames
Spanish-language surnames
Sephardic surnames
Greek-language surnames
Surnames of Spanish origin
Surnames of Mexican origin